Aili Mari Tripp (born 24 May 1958) is a Finnish and American political scientist, currently the Wangari Maathai Professor of Political Science and Gender and Women's Studies at the University of Wisconsin-Madison.

Education and early career
Tripp is a dual Finnish-U.S. citizen. She was born in the United Kingdom to a Finnish mother and American father, and spent fifteen years of her childhood in Tanzania. In 1983, she graduated with a B.A. in political science from the University of Chicago, earning an MA in Middle East studies form the same institution in 1985. She then received a PhD in political science from Northwestern University in 1990. From 1989 to 1991, Tripp was a research associate with the John D. and Catherine T. MacArthur Foundation from 1989 to 1991.

Career
Tripp has published six books. Her first, Changing the Rules: The Politics of Liberalization and the Urban Informal Economy in Tanzania, was published in 1997, and was based on her PhD dissertation at Northwestern University. Her subsequent books have won several awards. Her second book, published in 2000 and entitled Women and Politics in Uganda, won the 2001 Victoria Schuck Award of the American Political Science Association for the best book in women and politics, as well as a Choice Reviews Outstanding Academic Title Award. Tripp's 2015 book Women and Politics in Postconflict Africa won the Best Book in African Politics award from the African Politics Conference Group, and was a finalist or runner-up for multiple awards from the African Studies Association.

Tripp has held several professional and service positions for major research organisations and journals. After serving as president of the African Studies Association in 2011-2012, Tripp won the 2014 African Studies Association Public Service Award. She was also the vice-president of the American Political Science Association in 2006. Tripp has received research awards and fellowships from bodies such as the American Academy in Berlin, Fulbright, Woodrow Wilson International Center for Scholars, Social Science Research Council, American Association of University Women, John D. and Catherine T. MacArthur Foundation, and the American Council of Learned Societies.

Tripp is a member of the 2020-2024 editorial leadership of the American Political Science Review, which is the most selective political science journal.

Personal life
Tripp has lived in Finland, Tanzania, Uganda, United Kingdom, Germany, United States and Morocco.

Books
Changing the Rules: The Politics of Liberalization and the Urban Informal Economy in Tanzania. Berkeley and Los Angeles: University of California Press. 1997.
Women and Politics in Uganda. Madison: University of Wisconsin Press. Oxford: James Currey and Kampala: Fountain Publishers. 2000.
African Women's Movements: Transforming Political Landscapes. with Isabel Casimiro, Joy Kwesiga, and Alice Mungwa. New York: Cambridge University Press. 2009.
Museveni's Uganda: Paradoxes of Power in a Hybrid Regime. Boulder: Lynne Rienner. 2010. 
Women and Power in Postconflict Africa. New York: Cambridge University Press. 2015.

References

External links
 Aili Mari Tripp at University of Wisconsin-Madison

1958 births
Living people
University of Chicago alumni
Northwestern University alumni
University of Wisconsin–Madison faculty
American people of Finnish descent
American political scientists
American women political scientists
Finnish expatriates in Tanzania
Finnish expatriates in Uganda
Finnish expatriates in Germany
Finnish expatriates in Morocco
Finnish expatriates in the United Kingdom
Finnish people of American descent
Finnish political scientists
Presidents of the African Studies Association
American expatriates in Tanzania
American expatriates in the United Kingdom
American expatriates in Uganda
American expatriates in Germany
American expatriates in Morocco
20th-century American women
21st-century American women
20th-century Finnish women
21st-century Finnish women